This is a list of non-Paraguayan footballers who currently play or have played Football in Paraguay. For CONMEBOL or South American foreign football players in Paraguay, Argentina, Brazil and Uruguay are the countries that have contributed most players to Paraguayan football. Argentine football players, such as Roberto Acuña and Ricardo Ismael Rojas, played in for several years in Paraguay's leagues and even naturalized themselves to play for the national team. Argentine Héctor Núñez, Uruguayan Hernan Rodrigo Lopez and Brazilian Gauchinho are the only non-Paraguayan football players to be leading goalscorers of the Primera División Paraguaya in a single season, including the Apertura and Clausura. Héctor Núñez is the only foreign player to win the goalscoring title back-to-back (1994–1995), playing for Cerro Porteño. Most non-CONMEBOL or non-South American foreign football players in Paraguay's football leagues have come from African (CAF) countries, especially Cameroon, and from Asian (AFC) countries, especially Japan. Amongst the non-CONMEBOL foreign football players in Paraguay, the most iconic signing in Paraguayan football and the highest paid player in the country's history was the Togolese Emmanuel Adebayor, when he joined Olimpia Asunción in 2020. Between 2008 and 2011, 30 under-15 footballers from Indonesia, including Zikri Akbar and Rahmanuddin played at diverse clubs in Paraguay's Football League. In 2016, Trinidad and Tobago women's national team players Kennya Cordner and Kimika Forbes became the first CONCACAF players in to win a trophy in the CONMEBOL, being crowned champions of the Copa Libertadores Femenina with Paraguayan club Sportivo Limpeño.

Africa (CAF)

Asia (AFC)

Europe (UEFA)

North America, Central America & Caribbean (CONCACAF)

South America (CONMEBOL)
This list is incomplete. You can help by expanding it

Oceania (OFC)
 None

Gallery

References 

Paraguay
Association football player non-biographical articles
foreign